South West is a constituency represented in the London Assembly.  It was represented, since its creation in 2000, by Tony Arbour, a Conservative from Richmond upon Thames. Following Tony Arbour's retirement, the seat was won by Nick Rogers in the 2021 election.

It covers the combined area of the London Borough of Hounslow, the Royal Borough of Kingston upon Thames, and the London Borough of Richmond upon Thames.

Assembly members

Mayoral election results 
Below are the results for the candidate which received the highest share of the popular vote in the constituency at each mayoral election.

Assembly election results

References

External links
  2004 result

London Assembly constituencies
Politics of the London Borough of Hounslow
Politics of the Royal Borough of Kingston upon Thames
Politics of the London Borough of Richmond upon Thames
2000 establishments in England
Constituencies established in 2000